The International Cricket Council Player Rankings is a widely followed system of rankings  for international cricketers based on their recent performances. The current sponsor is MRF Tyres who signed a 4-year deal with the ICC that will last until 2020.
Currently 10 teams are considered for WODI ranking whereas for WT20I it includes all the eligible association members of ICC. The rankings include the top 10 WODI and WT20I batsmen, bowlers and all-rounders based on the rating of the each player.

Ranking calculations 
For the ICC player ranking, the same methods are used for both Men and Women. The player rankings are a points methods of all player's performance. with recent matches performance effect player's rank. Each match performance is given a rating out of 1000. But 1000 rating was rare achievement. This means that the maximum possible overall rating per person only rating 1000, and a player gaining a rating of 900 is seen as an exceptional achievement. Separate lists are maintained for batting and bowling and an all-rounder rating is also published, which is obtained by multiplying a player's batting and bowling rating together and dividing by 1000. For batting, the performance rating is based on a combination of runs scored, the rating of the opposition bowlers, match result and comparison to the overall scores in the match. A bowler gains points based on wickets taken, runs conceded and match result, with more points gained for dismissing highly rated batsmen. A damping-factor is applied to a player's rating at the start of their career.

Current rankings

ODI rankings

Top 10 WODI batters

Top 10 WODI bowlers

Top 10 WODI all-rounders

T20I rankings

Top 10 WT20I batters

Top 10 WT20I bowlers

Top 10 WT20I all-rounders

See also

International cricket
ICC Men's Player Rankings
Women's cricket
Women's One Day International cricket
Women's Twenty20 International

References

External links
ICC Official site

Rankings
Women's cricket